The 1975 season of the Soviet Top League proved that Dynamo Kyiv was at the moment unbeatable for other Soviet clubs. Besides that, the Ukrainian club was one of the strongest on the international arena, winning the UEFA Cup Winners Cup the same year. Another Ukrainian club, Shakhtar from Donetsk, took the second place.

Final league table

Results

Top scorers
18 goals
 Oleg Blokhin (Dynamo Kyiv)

13 goals
 Boris Kopeikin (CSKA Moscow)

12 goals
 Vladimir Danilyuk (Karpaty)
 David Kipiani (Dinamo Tbilisi)
 Viktor Kolotov (Dynamo Kyiv)

11 goals
 Mykhaylo Sokolovsky (Shakhtar)

10 goals
 Arkady Andreasyan (Ararat)
 Roman Khizhak (Karpaty)
 Eduard Markarov (Ararat)

9 goals
 Vitali Starukhin (Shakhtar)

References

 Soviet Union - List of final tables (RSSSF)

1969
1
Soviet
Soviet